Jānis Dūklavs (born 24 November 1952, Ķegums, Latvia) is a Latvian politician from Union of Greens and Farmers. Dūklavs was Minister of Agriculture of Latvia from 2014 to 2019.

Dūklavs came into disrepute during the Hotel Rīdzene leaks scandal in 2017, during which transcripts of secretly recorded talks between Aivars Lembergs, Andris Šķēle, Ainārs Šlesers and other individuals at the Hotel Rīdzene were published by the Ir magazine. The transcripts of the recordings feature Dūklavs asking Ainārs Šlesers for help selling a piece of undeclared land next to the Riga Freeport for 15 million Euros.

References

1952 births
Living people
People from Ķegums Municipality
Ministers of Agriculture of Latvia
Deputies of the 10th Saeima
Deputies of the 11th Saeima
Deputies of the 12th Saeima
Deputies of the 13th Saeima
Latvia University of Life Sciences and Technologies alumni